The Mechanics' Institute Chess Club is a chess club in San Francisco, California, United States. Hosted at the Mechanics' Institute, it  is the oldest-continuously operating chess club in the United States.

History
The first meeting of the Mechanics' Institute in San Francisco was held on December 11, 1854, and it was incorporated on April 24, 1855. At the time, San Francisco was a frontier city that had grown from the California Gold Rush. Today the Mechanics' Institute hosts national and international chess tournaments, offers virtual and onsite classes, and provides scholastic chess classes in partnership with local schools.

The first world-class player to visit San Francisco was Johann Zukertort, who spent nearly a month in the city in July 1884. George H. D. Gossip visited the city and the club in 1888, writing an account of chess in San Francisco for the June 1888 International Chess Magazine. Many other leading players have given exhibitions or played at the Institute, including Harry Pillsbury, Géza Maróczy, Frank Marshall (1913 and 1915), Borislav Kostić (1915), Samuel Reshevsky (1921 and 1956), Arthur Dake (1937 among many others), Georges Koltanowski (1939), Svetozar Gligorić, and Tony Miles. The Institute has also been visited by many world champions, including Emanuel Lasker (1902 and 1926), José Capablanca (1916), Alexander Alekhine (1924 and 1929), Max Euwe (1947 or 1949?), Bobby Fischer (1964), Vasily Smyslov (1976), Tigran Petrosian (1978), Anatoly Karpov (1999), and Boris Spassky (1980 and 2006).

The chess club is the oldest-continuously operating chess club in the United States.

Events
The Chess Room holds regular USCF and FIDE rated tournaments, including blitz and rapid events. On May 2, 2019, the Mechanics' Institute Club Rapid Championship brought 13 Grandmasters and 37 titled players in total, making it the strongest tournament ever held in the Mechanics' Institute Chess Club. The event featured a 3-way tie for first between GM Fabiano Caruana, GM Jon Ludvig Hammer, and GM Georg Meier. The chess club also hosts free chess classes and scholastic programs.

Chess Room Directors of the Mechanics Institute
 Arthur Stamer (1951–1964)
 Kurt Bendit (1963-1964) 
 Howard Donnelly (1964-1965) 
 William Addison (1965–1969)
 Alan Bourke (1969-1971) 
 Ray Conway (1971-1980) 
 Max Wilkerson (1980–1996)
 James Eade (1996-1998)
 William John Donaldson (1998-2018)
 Abel Garza Talamantez (2018-2022)

References

External links

1855 establishments in California
1855 in chess
Chess clubs in the United States
Culture of San Francisco
History of San Francisco
Sports clubs established in 1855
Sports in San Francisco